The Descent is a 2005 British horror film written and directed by Neil Marshall. The film follows six women who enter a cave system and struggle to survive against the humanoid creatures inside.

Filming took place in the United Kingdom. Exterior scenes were filmed at Ashridge Park, Hertfordshire, and in Scotland. Because the filmmakers considered it too dangerous and time-consuming to shoot in an actual cave, interior scenes were filmed on sets built at Pinewood Studios near London designed by Simon Bowles.

The Descent opened in cinemas in the United Kingdom on 8 July 2005. It premiered in the 2006 Sundance Film Festival and released on 4 August 2006 in the United States. The film received positive reviews and was a box-office success, grossing $57.1 million against a £3.5 million budget.

A sequel, titled The Descent Part 2, directed by the first film's editor Jon Harris, was released in 2009.

Plot
Thrill seeker friends Sarah, Juno, and Beth whitewater raft together. Afterward, Sarah, along with her husband Paul and their daughter Jessica, are involved in a car accident when Paul is distracted. Paul and Jessica are killed, but Sarah survives.

One year later, Sarah, Juno, and Beth, as well as friends Sam, Rebecca, and newcomer Holly reunite at a cabin in the Appalachian Mountains of North Carolina for a spelunking adventure. The next day, they hike up to a mountain cave entrance and descend. While in the cave, Juno apologizes to Sarah for not being there for her after the accident, but Sarah is distant. After the group moves through a narrow passage, it collapses behind them, trapping them. After a heated discussion, Juno admits that she has led the group into an unknown cave system instead of the fully explored cave system that they had originally planned to visit, and so rescue is therefore impossible. She then tells Sarah that this adventure was in the hopes of restoring their relationship.

As the group presses forward with hopes of finding an exit, they discover aged climbing equipment and a cave painting that suggests an exit exists. Holly, thinking she sees sunlight, runs ahead, but falls down a hole and breaks her leg. As the others help Holly, Sarah wanders off and observes a pale, humanoid creature drinking at a pool before it scampers away. Later, the group comes across a den of animal bones and is suddenly attacked by a creature known as a "crawler." Holly is killed when a crawler attacks and bites through her throat. Sarah runs and falls down a hole, where she is knocked unconscious. Juno, trying to prevent Holly's body from being dragged away, kills a crawler with her pickaxe but then, startled and in shock, accidentally strikes Beth through the neck. Beth collapses with Juno's pendant in her hand and begs Juno not to leave her, but a traumatized Juno flees.

Sarah awakens to find herself in a den of human and animal carcasses, witnessing Holly's body being mauled and eaten by crawlers. Juno discovers cave markings from previous explorers that point to a specific path through the caves. Juno locates Sam and Rebecca. Sam has deduced that the crawlers are blind and rely on sound to hunt. Juno tells them about the markings, but she will not leave without Sarah.

Meanwhile, Sarah encounters Beth, who tells her that Juno wounded then abandoned her. Beth gives her Juno's pendant, telling her it is a gift from Paul, and realizes that Juno and Paul had an affair before his death. Beth begs Sarah to euthanize her, which Sarah reluctantly does by bashing her head in with a rock. Sarah then encounters several crawlers and manages to kill them all, falling into a blood-filled pond in the process and emerging covered in blood.

Elsewhere, Juno, Sam and Rebecca are pursued by a large group of crawlers. They reach a chasm and Sam tries to climb across, but a crawler scaling the ceiling attacks and rips her throat out. Sam stabs it before bleeding to death in front of Juno and Rebecca. Rebecca is then dragged away and eaten alive as Juno escapes. Juno encounters Sarah and lies to her about seeing Beth die. After defeating a group of crawlers close to the exit, Sarah confronts Juno, revealing the pendant and her knowledge of Beth's fate and the affair with Paul. Sarah then strikes Juno in the leg with a pickaxe and leaves her to die as a swarm of crawlers approaches. Juno is last heard screaming as Sarah escapes. Sarah falls down a hole and is knocked unconscious.

When Sarah awakens, she sees sunlight and clambers up a slope covered in bones to escape the cave. After exhaustedly running to her car, she speeds out of the woods before she pulls over to the side of the road, breaking down in tears. After a truck passes her, she vomits out the window. When she sits up, she sees a hallucination of a bloodied Juno sitting next to her and screams.

Extended ending
In the original release in the United Kingdom, an extended ending is presented, which was cut for the US release over concerns that it was too depressing. After hallucinating the image of Juno, Sarah awakens in the cave, her entire escape having been revealed to be part of the same hallucination. She sits up to see Jessica sitting across from her, holding a birthday cake. As Sarah smiles the shot widens to reveal that the cake's birthday-candlelight is actually the light of her torch. The camera slowly backs out, revealing the darkness surrounding Sarah as the crawlers are heard closing in.

Cast
 Shauna Macdonald as Sarah Carter
 Natalie Mendoza as Juno Kaplan
 MyAnna Buring as Samantha "Sam" Vernet
 Saskia Mulder as Rebecca Vernet
 Alex Reid as Elizabeth "Beth" O'Brien
 Nora-Jane Noone as Holly Mills
 Oliver Milburn as Paul Carter
 Molly Kayll as Jessica Carter

Production
When Neil Marshall's film Dog Soldiers (2002) was a moderate success, the director received numerous requests to direct other horror films. The director was initially wary of being typecast as a horror film director, although he eventually agreed to make The Descent, emphasizing, "They are very different films."

Casting
Filmmakers originally planned for the cast to be both male and female, but Neil Marshall's business partner realized that horror films rarely have all-female casts. Defying convention, Marshall cast all women, and to avoid making them clichéd, he solicited basic advice from his female friends. He explained the difference, "The women discuss how they feel about the situation, which the soldiers in Dog Soldiers would never have done." He also gave the characters different accents to enable the audience to tell them apart and to establish a more "cosmopolitan feel" than the British marketing of Dog Soldiers.

The cast included Shauna Macdonald as Sarah, Natalie Mendoza as Juno, Alex Reid as Beth, Saskia Mulder as Rebecca, MyAnna Buring as Sam, Nora-Jane Noone as Holly, Oliver Milburn as Paul, and Molly Kayll as Jessica. Craig Conway portrayed one of the film's crawlers, Scar.

Filming
While The Descent is set in North America, the film was shot entirely in the United Kingdom. Exterior scenes were filmed in Scotland, and interior scenes were filmed in sets built at Pinewood Studios, near London. The cave was built at Pinewood because filmmakers considered it too dangerous and time-consuming to shoot in an actual cave. Set pieces were reused with care, and filmmakers sought to limit lighting to the sources the characters bring with them into the cave, such as helmet lights.

Marshall cited the films The Texas Chain Saw Massacre, The Thing, and Deliverance as influences in establishing tension in The Descent. The director elaborated, "We really wanted to ramp up the tension slowly, unlike all the American horror films you see now. They take it up to 11 in the first few minutes and then simply can't keep it up. We wanted to show all these terrible things in the cave: dark, drowning, claustrophobia. Then, when it couldn't get any worse, make it worse." Marshall also said at the 63rd Venice International Film Festival that he was inspired by Italian horror films of the past, in particular, those by Dario Argento and Lucio Fulci.

Simon Bowles designed the maze of caves for The Descent. Reviews credited Bowles: e.g., "Bowles' beautifully designed cave sets conjure a world of subterranean darkness."
The film had twenty-one cave sets, built by Rod Vass and his company Armordillo Ltd. using a unique system of polyurethane sprayed rock that was developed for this production.

Production of The Descent competed with a big-budget American film that had a similar premise, The Cave. The Descent was originally scheduled to be released in the United Kingdom by November 2005 or February 2006, but The Cave began filming six months before its competitor. The filmmakers of The Descent decided to release their film before The Cave, so they fast-tracked production to be completed by the end of February 2005.

Editing
The Descent was released in North America with approximately one minute cut from the end. In the American cut, Sarah escapes from the cave and sees Juno, but the film does not cut back to the cave. The 4 August 2006 issue of Entertainment Weekly reported that the ending was trimmed because American viewers did not like its "uber-hopeless finale". Lionsgate marketing chief Tim Palen said, "It's a visceral ride, and by the time you get to the ending you're drained. [Director Neil] Marshall had a number of endings in mind when he shot the film, so he was open [to making a switch]." Marshall compared the change to the ending of The Texas Chain Saw Massacre, saying, "Just because she gets away, does that make it a happy ending?" The ending is featured on DVD as an "unrated cut" in the United States.

Creature design
In the film, the women encounter underground creatures referred to as crawlers by the production crew. Marshall described the crawlers as cavemen who have stayed underground. The director explained, "They've evolved in this environment over thousands of years. They've adapted perfectly to thrive in the cave. They've lost their eyesight, they have acute hearing and smell and function perfectly in the pitch black. They're expert climbers, so they can go up any rock face and that is their world." Filmmakers kept the crawler design hidden from the actresses until they were revealed in the scenes in which the characters encountered the creatures, to allow for natural tension.

Conception
Director Neil Marshall first chose to have a dark cave as the setting for his horror film The Descent then decided to add the element of the crawlers, describing them as "something that could get the women, something human, but not quite". The crawlers were depicted as cavemen who never left the caves and evolved in the dark. The director included mothers and children in the colony of creatures, defining his vision, "It is a colony and I thought that was far more believable than making them the classic monsters. If they had been all male, it would have made no sense, so I wanted to create a more realistic context for them. I wanted to have this very feral, very primal species living underground, but I wanted to make them human. I didn't want to make them aliens because humans are the scariest things."

The crawlers were designed by Paul Hyett, a makeup and prosthetics creator. Production designer Simon Bowles said that the crawler design had started out as "wide-eyed and more creature-like", but the design shifted toward a more human appearance. Crawlers originally had pure white skin, but the look was adjusted to seem grubbier. The skin was originally phosphorescent in appearance, but the effect was too bright and reflective in the darkened set, so the adjustment was made for them to blend in shadows. The director barred the film's cast from seeing the actors in full crawler make-up until their first appearance on screen. Actress Natalie Mendoza said of the effect, "When the moment came, I nearly wet my pants!  I was running around afterwards, laughing in this hysterical way and trying to hide the fact that I was pretty freaked out. Even after that scene, we never really felt comfortable with them."

The crawlers reappear in The Descent Part 2, a sequel by Jon Harris with the first film's director Neil Marshall as executive producer. For the sequel, Hyett improved the camouflaging ability of the crawlers' skin tones to deliver better scares. According to Hyett, "Jon wanted them more viciously feral, inbred, scarred and deformed, with rows of sharklike teeth for ripping flesh."  A charnel house was designed for the crawlers as well as a set that the crew called the "Crawler Crapper".

Description
Rene Rodriguez of The Miami Herald described the crawlers as "blind, snarling cave-dwellers, looking much like Gollum's bigger kin". Douglas Tseng of The Straits Times also noted that the crawlers looked similar to Gollum, being a cross between the creature and the vampiric Reapers from Blade II. David Germain of the Associated Press noted of the crawlers, "[They] have evolved to suit their environment—eyes blind because of the darkness in which they dwell, skin slimy and gray, ears batlike to channel their super-hearing." The crawlers are sexually dimorphic, with males being completely bald, whilst females sport thick dark hair on their heads. They are nocturnal hunters which surface from their caves to hunt for prey and bring the spoils of their hunts to their caverns.

Marketing
The skull of women motif used in some advertising material is based on Philippe Halsman's In Voluptas Mors photograph.

The film's marketing campaign in the United Kingdom was disrupted by the London bombings in July 2005. Advertisements on London's public transport system (including the bus that had exploded) had included posters that carried the quote, "Outright terror... bold and brilliant", and depicted a terrified woman screaming in a tunnel. The film's theatrical distributor in the UK, Pathé, recalled the posters from their placement in the London Underground and reworked the campaign to exclude the word "terror" from advertised reviews of The Descent. Pathé also distributed the new versions to TV and radio stations. The distributor's marketing chief, Anna Butler, said of the new approach, "We changed tack to concentrate on the women involved all standing together and fighting back. That seemed to chime with the prevailing mood of defiance that set in the weekend after the bombs." Neil Marshall stated in a review "Shauna was pretty upset about it; it was on newspapers all across the county" and cites the attacks as harming the film's box office, as "people were still trapped underground in reality, so no one really wanted to go see a film about people trapped underground...". Many commentators, including writers for Variety and The Times, remarked on the rather unfortunate coincidence.

Due to these events there was some initial concern that the film's release might have been delayed out of sensitivity for the tragedy but Pathé ultimately chose to release the film on schedule, with a slightly retooled advertising campaign; however, the US promotional campaign managed by Lionsgate Films was significantly different from the original European version.

Release

Reception

The Descent premiered at the Edinburgh horror film festival Dead by Dawn on 6 July 2005. The film opened commercially to the public in the UK on 10 July 2005, showing on 329 screens and earned £2.6 million. The film received limited releases in other European countries. The London bombings in the same month was reported to have affected the box office performance of The Descent.

Based on 187 reviews collected by Rotten Tomatoes, it received an approval rating of 86% with an average rating of 7.4/10. The website's critical consensus reads, "Deft direction and strong performances from its all-female cast guide The Descent, a riveting, claustrophobic horror film." Metacritic calculated an average score of 71 out of 100 from 30 critics, indicating "generally favorable reviews". On its debut weekend in the US, The Descent opened with a three-day gross of $8.8 million, and finished with $26,005,908. Total worldwide box office receipts are $57,051,053.

Roger Ebert's editor, Jim Emerson, reviewed the film for Ebert's column whilst Ebert was on leave due to surgery, giving it four out of four stars. He wrote, "This is the fresh, exciting summer movie I've been wanting for months. Or for years, it seems."

Manohla Dargis of The New York Times described The Descent as "one of the better horror entertainments of the last few years", calling it "indisputably and pleasurably nerve-jangling". Dargis applauded the claustrophobic atmosphere of the film, though she perceived sexual overtones in the all-female cast with their laboured breathing and sweaty clothing. Rene Rodriguez of The Miami Herald thought that the film devolved into a guessing game of who would survive, though he praised Marshall's "nightmare imagery" for generating scares that work better than other horror films. Rodriguez also noted the attempt to add dimension to the female characters but felt that the actresses were unable to perform.

Top ten lists, 2006:
 1st – Bravo's 13 Even Scarier Movie Moments
 7th — Sight & Sound
 10th – Nathan Lee, Village Voice
 10th – Stephen Hunter, The Washington Post

Bloody Disgusting ranked the film third in their list of the 'Top 20 Horror Films of the Decade', with the article saying "One of the scariest films of this or any decade... Ultimately, The Descent is the purest kind of horror film – ruthless, unforgiving, showing no mercy." In the early 2010s, Time Out conducted a poll with several authors, directors, actors and critics who have worked within the horror genre to vote for their top horror films. The Descent placed at number 39 on their top 100 list.

Lawrence Toppman of The Charlotte Observer thought a weakness of The Descent was the failure of the writer to explain the evolution of the creature, though he said, "Their clicking and howling, used for echolocation and communication, makes them more alien; this otherness gives humans permission to mutilate them without seeming too disgusting to be sympathetic." Michael Wilmington of the Chicago Tribune thought that the crawlers should have been left out of the film, believing, "Watching those gray, slithering beings chasing and biting the women makes it hard to maintain any suspension of disbelief."

Home media
The Descent was released on DVD and Blu-ray on 26 December 2006. The discs contain both the unaltered UK release and the edited US theatrical cut, the former being advertised as an "unrated" version.

Sequel

A sequel to The Descent was filmed at Ealing Studios in London during 2008 and was released on 2 December 2009 in the UK.

References

External links

 
 
 
 
 
 The Descent entry in The A.V. Clubs New Cult Canon

2000s adventure films
2000s female buddy films
2000s horror thriller films
2000s monster movies
2005 films
2005 horror films
British adventure films
British female buddy films
British natural horror films
British monster movies
Films directed by Neil Marshall
Films scored by David Julyan
Films set in North Carolina
Films shot at Pinewood Studios
Adventure horror films
2000s English-language films
2000s British films